Kilflynn Pearses were a hurling team from North County Kerry. They won Kerry Senior Hurling Championships in 1938 & 1939 and were runners up in 1931.

Honours

 Kerry Senior Hurling Championship: (2) 1937, 1938

County Championship winning captains

 1937: Willie Shanahan 
 1938: John Twomey 

Former Gaelic Athletic Association clubs in Kerry
Gaelic games clubs in County Kerry
Hurling clubs in County Kerry